David Pretty (born 2 April 1951) is a former Australian rules footballer who played for North Melbourne in the Victorian Football League (VFL).

Recruited from Wodonga, Pretty spent five seasons at North Melbourne, either in defence or on the wing. He then joined the Perth Football Club and starred for them in the 1974 Grand Final, sharing the Simpson Medal with East Fremantle's Gary Gibellini, despite finishing on the losing team.

References

Holmesby, Russell and Main, Jim (2007). The Encyclopedia of AFL Footballers. 7th ed. Melbourne: Bas Publishing.

1951 births
Living people
Australian rules footballers from Victoria (Australia)
North Melbourne Football Club players
Perth Football Club players